The 2020 Supercopa de Chile (known as the Súper Copa Easy 2020 for sponsorship purposes) was the eighth edition of the Supercopa de Chile, championship organised by the Asociación Nacional de Fútbol Profesional (ANFP). The match was played by the 2019 Chilean Primera División champions Universidad Católica and the 2019 Copa Chile champions Colo-Colo on 21 March 2021 at Estadio Nacional Julio Martínez Prádanos in Santiago.

The match, scheduled to be played in the calendar year 2020, was postponed to 2021 due to the schedule disruptions caused by the 2019 Chilean protests which pushed back the conclusion of the 2019 Copa Chile to January 2020 and later the COVID-19 pandemic in Chile. Universidad Católica were the winners, claiming their third Supercopa title with a 4–2 victory after 90 minutes.

Teams
The two teams that contested the Supercopa were Universidad Católica, who qualified as 2019 Primera División champions and Colo-Colo, who qualified for the match as the 2019 Copa Chile champions, defeating Universidad de Chile in the final by a 2–1 score.

Details

References

2021 in Chilean football
Chile
S
S